Bird law can refer to:

Animal law, laws regarding animals in general
Migratory Bird Treaty Act of 1918, a US law regulating the hunting and capture of birds
Birds Directive, a European Union directive on the protection of wild birds and their habitats 
An area of law in the American television show It's Always Sunny in Philadelphia

See also
Audubon (magazine), formerly known as Bird-Lore
Ornithology, the study of birds